Muḥammad ibn Ibrāhīm ibn Jaʿfar al-Nuʿmānī, also known as Ibn Abī Zaynab, was a 10th-century Shi'a scholar. His last name suggest that his family came from al-Numaniyya, near Baghdad. He was reportedly a disciple of al-Kulayni (–941).

A Quran commentary is attributed to him titled .

References

Quranic exegesis scholars
10th-century Muslim scholars of Islam
Shia hadith scholars